The Republic of Vietnam Armed Forces Honor Medal was a military decoration of South Vietnam that was first created on January 7, 1953. The medal was awarded in two  classes and reached its height of bestowal during the Vietnam War. It was frequently awarded to members of foreign militaries, including military advisors of the United States Armed Forces.

The Armed Forces Honor Medal was awarded to any member of the military who actively contributed to the formation and organization of the Vietnamese military in South Vietnam and who actively participating in cadre training of Vietnamese units.  It was intended for non-combat achievements. 

The first-class medal was awarded to commissioned officers and the second class medals were awarded to warrant officers and enlisted personnel. The first-class medallion is gold and the second class' silver. Suspension and service ribbons for the two grades were distinguished by a gold and red pattern for the first class and two red patterns reaching each side on the second class. Both ribbons had three central light blue vertical stripes.

Today, the medal is only available from private dealers in military insignia.

Notable recipients
Charles Alvin Beckwith
Frederick C. Blesse
William Francis Buckley
Jon R. Cavaiani
Joseph W. Dailey
Wesley L. Fox
George Patton IV
Wilbur F. Simlik
Ormond R. Simpson
Bernard E. Trainor
Frederick C. Weyand
Herbert L. Wilkerson
James C. Hester
John R. Mac

References

External links

Military Orders, Decorations, and Medals of the Republic of Vietnam

Military awards and decorations of Vietnam